Anbu is a 2003 Indian Tamil romantic comedy drama film written and directed by Dalapathiraj. The film starred Bala and Deepu in the leading roles. It was a below average from films critics and audience.

Plot
Anbu (Bala), son of a politician Karuppiah (Vijayakumar), and Veena (Deepu) are lovers, but fate plays villain and the lovers are separated. Veena is from another caste and her father is against their marriage. So he gets her married to Adithya (Adithya) in Anbu's absence. Anbu in the meantime goes abroad and when he returns, he is shocked to hear the news about Veena's wedding. He rushes to Ooty with Subbiah (Vadivelu), where Veena is spending her honeymoon. Whether the lovers unite in the end forms the rest of this triangular love story.

Cast

Bala as Anbu
Deepu as Veena
Adithya as Adithya
Vadivelu as Subbaiah
Vijayakumar as Karuppaiah, Anbu's father
Sarath Babu as Adithya's father
Dhamu as Paari
Abhinayashree as Rasiga
Rekha as Veena's mother
Jyothi as Anbu's mother
Jaya Murali as Adithya's mother
Singamuthu as Customer
Halwa Vasu as Customer
Bonda Mani as Customer
Nellai Siva
Kovai Senthil

Soundtrack

The music was composed by Vidyasagar.

Release
The film opened to average reviews, with a critic noting the director "managed to present things in an entertaining fashion in spite of the familiar stories". Another critic noted "in the recent movies by the debutants, this is one explicit movie, which is worth watching". The film however did not perform well commercially at the box office.

Deepu went on to star in Nee Mattum (2004) also starring Vadivelu.

References

2003 films
2000s Tamil-language films
Films scored by Vidyasagar